Arne Svendsen (13 July 1909 – 28 April 1983) was a Norwegian footballer. He played in one match for the Norway national football team in 1933.

References

External links
 

1909 births
1983 deaths
Norwegian footballers
Norway international footballers
Place of birth missing
Association footballers not categorized by position